Ayudham is a 2003 Indian Telugu-language film, directed by N. Shankar and produced by Srinivasa Rao. The film stars Rajasekhar, Sangeetha, Brahmanandam and Gurleen Chopra.

Cast
 Rajasekhar as Siddartha 
 Sangeetha as Kalyani 
 Brahmanandam as Choudappa 
 Gurleen Chopra as Sravani
 Rajan P. Dev as Varadaraju 
 A. V. S.
 Jaya Prakash Reddy as Raghupati 
 Ahuti Prasad as Industrialist
 Narra Venkateswara Rao as Police officer
 Ashok Kumar as Minister  
 Kaushal Manda
 Kalabhavan Mani as Pithapuram 
Sivaji as Rushendra (Rishi)
 Gundu Sudarshan
 Venu Madhav
 Sona Heiden

Soundtrack
The music was composed by Vandemataram Srinivas.

References

External links
 

2003 films
2000s Telugu-language films
Indian action drama films
Films set in Hyderabad, India
Films shot in Hyderabad, India
Films directed by N. Shankar
2003 action drama films